This is a list of covered bridges on the National Register of Historic Places in the U.S. state of Pennsylvania. Other bridges and tunnels on the National Register of Historic Places in Pennsylvania are listed elsewhere.

In the early 1800s, the first covered bridge in the United States was constructed by Timothy Palmer crossing the Schuylkill River at 30th Street in Philadelphia.  This new bridge type, wooden with a covered span, was developed because traditional European methods, typically stone bridges, were not appropriate for the harsh Pennsylvania winters.  Many of the bridges were named for pioneer families residing near the bridges.

Some people call Pennsylvania the "Covered Bridge Capital of the Nation".

Current listings

Former listings

References

External links

The Theodore Burr Covered Bridge Society of Pennsylvania
Covered Bridges of Pennsylvania

 
Pennsylvania
Bridges
Bridges
Pennsylvania